Guachí (Wachí) is an extinct, apparently Guaicuruan language of Argentina.  It is usually classified as one of the Guaicuruan languages, but the data is insufficient to demonstrate that.

Documentation
Guachi is known only from 145 words collected by Francis de Castelnau from March to early April of 1845 in the Miranda area of Argentina.

Classification
Viegas Barros (2004) proposes that Guachi, as well as Payaguá, may be a Macro-Guaicurúan language. However, Campbell (2012) classifies Guachi as a language isolate.

Vocabulary
Guachi words and affixes listed in Viegas Barros (2004):

{| class="wikitable sortable"
! no. !! Spanish gloss(original) !! English gloss(translated) !! Guachi
|-
| 1 || agua || water || euak
|-
| 2 || lago || lake || tawicha
|-
| 3 || estrella || star || aati
|-
| 4 || posiblemente día || day ? || aanau-, naau-
|-
| 5 || diente || tooth || iava
|-
| 6 || labios || lips || iapé
|-
| 7 || ojo || eye || iataya
|-
| 8 || ceja || eyebrow || iticha
|-
| 9 || cabeza || head || iotapa
|-
| 10 || hombro || shoulder || -eu (< iolai-eu)
|-
| 11 || cabello || hair || ioatriz
|-
| 12 || mentón || chin || irak
|-
| 13 || comer || eat || iik
|-
| 14 || dormir || sleep || amma
|-
| 15 || golpear, batir || hit, beat || sapak
|-
| 16 || sentarse || sit down || ineche
|-
| 17 || posiblemente indígena || indigenous ? || -euleuc
|-
| 18 || hijo || son || inna
|-
| 19 || dos || two || eu-echo
|-
| 20 || no || no || an
|-
| 21 || gallina || hen || wokaake
|-
| 22 || pipa || pipe || ouchete
|-
| 23 || posiblemente otra vez || again ? || -way
|-
| 24 || posiblemente negación léxica || negation ? || ag-
|-
| 25 || posiblemente posesivo de 1ª. p. sing. || 1.SG possessive ? || i-
|-
| 26 || posiblemente plural nominal || nominal plural ? || -i
|-
| 27 || posiblemente femenino || feminine ? || -jen
|-
| 28 || lluvia || rain || fou-é
|-
| 29 || calor || hot || o-outé
|-
| 30 || pierna || leg || iacté
|-
| 31 || matar || kill || outei
|-
| 32 || hambre || hungry || yawookta
|-
| 33 || anciano || old man || seera
|-
| 34 || demasiado || excessively || euaité
|-
| 35 || pez || fish || aney
|-
| 36 || lagartija || lizard || kaliske
|-
| 37 || papagayo || parrot || calicheechee
|-
| 38 || tucán || toucan || iacat
|-
| 39 || armadillo || armadillo || tatae sia
|-
| 40 || sable || saber || nasakanate
|-
| 41 || luna || moon || o-alete
|-
| 42 || tierra || earth || leek
|-
| 43 || nariz || nose || ia-note
|-
| 44 || pierna || leg || iacalep
|-
| 45 || muslo || thigh || iakamnan
|-
| 46 || posiblemente uno || one ? || -kailau
|-
| 47 || tres || three || eu-echo-kailau
|-
| 48 || hablar || talk || ieuech
|-
| 49 || cansarse || become tired || ya-weul
|-
| 50 || cocinar || cook || ayai
|-
| 51 || sufijo derivativo de significado posible ‘parecido a’ || suffix < ‘alike’ ? || -tok
|-
| 52 || caballo || horse || ometok
|-
| 53 || papagayo (Arara) || parrot (Arara) || caga
|-
| 54 || casa || house || poecha
|-
| 55 || canoa || canoe || nook
|-
| 56 || fusil || rifle || ta-ai
|-
| 57 || maza, porra || club, bludgeon || palley
|-
| 58 || piedra || stone || sitrat
|-
| 59 || frío || cold || catate
|-
| 60 || garganta || throat || iracheu
|-
| 61 || vientre || belly || iet
|-
| 62 || leche || milk || lachouway
|-
| 63 || mano || hand || -mason (< iolaimason)
|-
| 64 || morder || bite || apa-eu
|}

References

Languages of Argentina
Guaicuruan languages
Extinct languages of South America
Language isolates of South America
Chaco linguistic area